Sandro Puppo (28 January 1918 – 16 October 1986) was an Italian football manager and former player who played as a midfielder.

Club career
During his playing days, Puppo played for Italian clubs Piacenza, Ambrosiana, Venezia and A.S. Roma in the 1930s and 1940s.

International career
At international level, Puppo was a member of the Italy national football team that won a gold medal at the 1936 Summer Olympic football tournament.

Managerial career
Later he became a coach and managed the Turkey national football team in the 1954 FIFA World Cup, and went on to manage teams such as Barcelona, Juventus and Beşiktaş.

References

External links
 
 enciclopediadelcalcio
 Sandro Puppo (1954-55), FC Barcelona (per 2020-08-20)

1918 births
1986 deaths
Sportspeople from Piacenza
Italian footballers
Italian football managers
Italian expatriate football managers
Piacenza Calcio 1919 players
Serie A players
Inter Milan players
Venezia F.C. players
A.S. Roma players
1954 FIFA World Cup managers
FC Barcelona managers
Beşiktaş J.K. managers
Juventus F.C. managers
Süper Lig managers
Expatriate football managers in Spain
Expatriate football managers in Turkey
Turkey national football team managers
Italian expatriate sportspeople in Spain
Italian expatriate sportspeople in Turkey
Association football midfielders
Footballers from Emilia-Romagna